6'eren is a Danish subscription television channel operated by Warner Bros. Discovery EMEA. It replaced SBS Net on 1 January 2009.

The channel's target audience is males, branding itself with the slogan "Denmark's got a new TV Channel - and it's for men" (Danmark har fået en ny TV-kanal, og den er for mænd). The channel also shows La Liga and FA Cup football. Matches involving Swansea City during the 2013–14 Premier League season, were extensively shown on the channel due to Michael Laudrup's time at the club as manager.

Like other terrestrial distributed in Denmark, 6'eren does not interrupt shows with commercials.

6'eren is distributed through terrestrial, satellite and cable and is available to approximately 75% of all Danish households.

Sports rights

Football 
Danish Superliga 
FA Cup
Football League Cup

References

External links
 

Television stations in Denmark
Warner Bros. Discovery networks
Television channels and stations established in 2009
Warner Bros. Discovery EMEA